Ioannis Tamouridis (born 3 June 1980) is a Greek former professional cyclist from Thessaloniki, Greece. He started cycling in 1995 and he competed in the road and track disciplines. Tamouridis now works as a directeur sportif for UCI WorldTeam .

Career

Early career
Highlights of his earlier career include two medals in world track championships, in Points Races (Los Angeles 2005) and Scratch (Bordeaux 2006). He has won 4 medals in track world cup by 2006 and has more than 30 times become Greek national champion in all disciplines (road, track and mountain bike races) and all categories.

In 2008, Tamouridis was given a one-year ban from cycling, following a positive drugs test for oxandrolone, an androgen and anabolic steroid (AAS).

Euskaltel–Euskadi (2013)
He then joined the  team for the 2013 season, where he has affectionately become known as 'Tamu' among his teammates.

To date, he is the only Greek cyclist to have raced at the Spring Classics of Milan–San Remo, where he finished 88th out of 200 starters and 135 finishers under treacherous weather conditions, Paris–Roubaix, Tirreno–Adriatico and the Tour of Flanders. He is also the first Greek cyclist to have entered and finished a grand tour, the Giro d'Italia in 2013 where he participated in four bunch sprint finishes, achieving ninth place on the twelfth stage of the race. He also came seventh in the Premio della Fuga classification.

In June 2013 Tamouridis won both the Greek National Road Race Championships and Greek National Time Trial Championships titles, dedicating the latter to Rufino Murguía, 's team masseur, who was killed when the team's bus was involved in a crash.

Tamouridis rejoined  in 2014, after his previous team –  – folded at the end of the 2013 season.

Major results

Road
Source: 

1997
 National Junior Road Championships
1st  Time trial
1st  Road race
1998
 1st  Time trial, Balkan Junior Road Championships
 National Junior Road Championships
1st  Time trial
1st  Road race
 1st Overall Junior Tour of Greece
 1st Firenze–Naples
1999
 1st  Time trial, National Under-23 Road Championships
2000
 National Under-23 Road Championships
1st  Time trial
2nd Road race
2001
 1st  Time trial, National Under-23 Road Championships
 6th Time trial, Mediterranean Games
2002
 1st  Time trial, Balkan Under-23 Road Championships
 1st  Time trial, National Under-23 Road Championships
 1st Prologue Tour of Greece
2003
 1st  Time trial, National Road Championships
 3rd Overall Tour of Greece
 3rd Sacrifice Cup
2004
 4th Overall Tour of Greece
2005
 National Road Championships
1st  Time trial
3rd Road race
 9th Time trial, Mediterranean Games
2006
 1st  Road race, National Road Championships
2009
 1st  Time trial, National Road Championships
 3rd  Time trial, Mediterranean Games
 3rd Overall Tour du Maroc
 9th Overall Tour of Romania
1st Prologue
2010
 National Road Championships
1st  Road race
1st  Time trial
 3rd Overall Tour of Romania
 5th Overall Okolo Slovenska
2011
 National Road Championships
1st  Road race
1st  Time trial
 2nd Overall Tour of Greece
1st Stage 2a (ITT)
 2nd Overall Tour of Szeklerland
1st Stage 1
 2nd Overall Tour of Romania
1st Stage 3
 2nd Jūrmala Grand Prix
 3rd Overall Jelajah Malaysia
1st Stage 3
 3rd Grand Prix de la ville de Nogent-sur-Oise
 5th Tour of Vojvodina II
 7th Tour of Vojvodina I
2012
 1st  Time trial, National Road Championships
 1st Circuit d'Alger
 Tour of Romania
1st Points classification
1st Stages 1 (ITT), 7 & 9
 3rd Overall Tour of Greece
1st Mountains classification
 4th Overall Sibiu Cycling Tour
 5th Overall Troféu Joaquim Agostinho
 6th Overall Tour d'Algérie
 8th Overall Five Rings of Moscow
 8th Banja Luka–Belgrade I
 9th Overall Tour of Szeklerland
1st Stage 4b
2013
 National Road Championships
1st  Road race
1st  Time trial
 9th Paris–Tours
2014
 National Road Championships
2nd Time trial
3rd Road race
 2nd Overall Tour de Taiwan
1st Stage 4
 7th Overall Five Rings of Moscow
 9th Overall Tour de Serbie
 9th Race Horizon Park 2
2015
 National Road Championships
1st  Time trial
2nd Road race
 2nd Overall Tour of Estonia
 5th Belgrade–Banja Luka II
 5th Duo Normand (with Maksym Averin)
 9th Odessa Grand Prix 2
2016
 National Road Championships
1st  Road race
1st  Time trial

Grand Tour general classification results timeline

Track

1997
 1st  Points race, National Junior Track Championships
1998
 1st  Points race, Balkan Junior Track Championships
 1st  Points race, National Junior Track Championships
1999
 1st  Points race, National Under-23 Track Championships
 7th World Cup track team Pursuit
2002
 2nd European Points Race Championships
2003
 UCI Track World Cup Classics
6th Madison, Cape Town
6th Individual pursuit, Sydney
6th Points race, Sydney
2004
 1st Manchester Revolution track event – 1500m
 7th Team pursuit, UCI Track World Cup Classics, Aguascalientes
2005
 1st  Points race, National Track Championships
 2nd  Points race, UCI Track Cycling World Championships
 2004–05 UCI Track Cycling World Cup Classics
2nd  Points race, Sydney
3rd  Scratch, Manchester
 3rd  Scratch, 2005–06 UCI Track Cycling World Cup Classics, Manchester
2006
 2nd  Points race, 2005–06 UCI Track Cycling World Cup Classics, Carson
 UCI Track Cycling World Championships
3rd  Scratch
6th Points race
2007
 2nd  Points race, 2006–07 UCI Track Cycling World Cup Classics, Manchester
2009
 Points race, 2009–10 UCI Track Cycling World Cup Classics
1st  Cali
2nd  Melbourne

Mountain biking

1997
 1st  Cross-country, National Junior Mountain Bike Championships

Notes

References

External links

 

1980 births
Greek male cyclists
Living people
Sportspeople from Thessaloniki
Cyclists at the 2012 Summer Olympics
Cyclists at the 2016 Summer Olympics
Olympic cyclists of Greece
Greek track cyclists
Mediterranean Games bronze medalists for Greece
Mediterranean Games medalists in cycling
European Games competitors for Greece
Cyclists at the 2015 European Games
Competitors at the 2001 Mediterranean Games
Competitors at the 2009 Mediterranean Games